Minnesota's 9th congressional district is a now-obsolete district for representation in the United States House of Representatives which existed from 1903 to 1963. It generally consisted of the northwest corner of the state (parts of the current day 7th congressional district).

List of members representing the district

References

 Congressional Biographical Directory of the United States 1774–present

09
Former congressional districts of the United States
1903 establishments in Minnesota
1963 disestablishments in Minnesota